Charles C. Johnson (born October 3, 1864) was a Michigan politician.

Early life and education
Johnson was born on October 3, 1864 in Plainwell, Michigan. In 1886, Johnson moved to Mecosta Township, Michigan.

Career
Johnson served as clerk of Mescosta Township from 1905 to 1906. Johnson also served as township supervisor. On November 3, 1908, Johnson was elected to the Michigan House of Representatives, where he represented the Mecosta County district from January 6, 1909 to December 31, 1910.

Personal life
Johnson was married in 1888.

References

1864 births
Year of death unknown
People from Plainwell, Michigan
People from Mecosta County, Michigan
Republican Party members of the Michigan House of Representatives
19th-century American politicians